Amondara (Russian and Tajik: Амондара) is a village and jamoat in north-western Tajikistan. It is part of the city of Panjakent in Sughd Region. The jamoat has a total population of 13,380 (2015). It consists of 10 villages, including Maykatta (the seat), Amondara and Zarrinrud.

References

Populated places in Sughd Region
Jamoats of Tajikistan